Kang Soo-jin is a South Korean voice actress. She joined Munhwa Broadcasting Corporation's voice acting division in 1994. She is involved in radio broadcasts and video game voice acting as well.

Roles

Broadcast TV
 Yonggi Plus (EBS)

See also
 Munhwa Broadcasting Corporation
 MBC Voice Acting Division

Homepage
 MBC Voice Acting Division Kang Soo Jin Blog(in Korean)

South Korean video game actresses
South Korean voice actresses
Year of birth missing (living people)
Living people
South Korean radio actresses
Place of birth missing (living people)
20th-century South Korean actresses
21st-century South Korean actresses